Vieques Air Link (VAL, IATA code:V4) is a small Puerto Rico-based airline that links Vieques with Culebra and mainland Puerto Rico.

History 
Operations began during 1965, with owner Osvaldo "Val" Gonzalez-Duriex piloting a plane with three passengers from Vieques to Humacao. A Cherokee aircraft and another airplane were also acquired later, allowing the airline to serve Isla Verde International Airport.

In 1968, Vieques Air Link added a flight to St. Croix in the Virgin Islands.

In 1980 Fajardo Airport in Fajardo was built and Vieques Air Link started flights to the new airport immediately. In the 1980s the company increased the frequency of flights to San Juan, Humacao and Culebra. In 1989, Vieques Air Link lost its entire fleet to Hurricane Hugo. However, it soon acquired seven Britten-Norman Islanders and three Trislanders.

In the 1990s VAL got into financial trouble. However, with the Vieques conflict, more and more Puerto Ricans began flying Vieques Air Link every day to go to military camps to protest, and the police also had to fly their personnel and the people arrested in those areas on VAL planes at various times. Others, like political leaders Ruben Berrios and Fernando Martín, and the 2002 Miss Puerto Rico Carla Tricoli, who is a Viequense, have had pictures taken by the press aboard VAL planes while flying to Vieques, giving the airline a new wave of unpaid-for promotional attention. In addition, in June 2000, the airline made the cover of Islander News magazine, under the headline "Vieques Air Link: How To Survive a Hurricane", about the airline's fleet loss of 1989 and how it survived the potentially fatal financial disaster.

In 2008, VAL added a new route between Antonio Rivera Rodríguez Airport (VQS) in Vieques and the new José Aponte de la Torre Airport (RVR) at the former Roosevelt Roads Naval Base in Ceiba, shortening the flight between Vieques and the Puerto Rican mainland to seven or eight minutes in a Cessna Caravan.

Destinations 
Vieques Air Link provides service at the following locations:

Fleet 

Cessna 402C             1
Piper Aztec

Accidents and incidents
December 21, 1971 – an Islander, N589JA, with 1 crew and 7 passengers crashed at Culebra airport. Upon landing, The aircraft bounced on landing. The pilot initiated a go-around over hills. The aircraft was unable to clear a house and crashed.
December 19, 1977 – an Islander, N862JA, crashed en route from St. Croix to Vieques when both engines stopped due to fuel exhaustion. The aircraft was ditched off Vieques. There were 9 passengers and a pilot on board. Five were killed and the aircraft was written off.
On January 26, 1980, a bomb was found on a Vieques Air Link plane that was about to be flown by Raul Mari Pesquera, son of Juan Mari Bras (in Spanish).
August 2, 1984 – an Islander, N589SA, operating as Vieques Air Link Flight 901A, crashed on initial climb out of Vieques en route to St. Croix. The Islander was overloaded by 600–700 pounds when it departed Vieques. Also, its centre of gravity was up to 5 inches behind the aft limit. After takeoff the left engine lost power. It lost altitude, banked abruptly to the left, nosed down and crashed into the ocean. It appeared that the fuel had been contaminated with water. On board were the pilot and 8 passengers, all were killed.
September 21, 1989 – the following Islanders were damaged beyond repair by Hurricane Hugo.
N112JC
N290VL
N457SA
November 19, 1999, N907VL, an Islander was damaged beyond repair at Anguilla Wallblake Airport by Hurricane Lenny.
On May 6, 2000, a Vieques Air Link pilot allegedly flew a company aircraft over Camp Garcia, a restricted US Navy area, on a scheduled flight an hour after protesters had been removed from the area by FBI agents and U.S. Marshals, resulting in the suspension of the pilot.
On June 2, 2020, 2 people died and one was seriously injured when a Vieques Air Link Piper Aztec crashed against two sailboats at San Juan Bay. It's not clear which of the two San Juan airports the flight was heading to. This marked the first incident involving fatalities for the airline in almost 36 years.

See also 

 Transportation in Puerto Rico#Airlines based in Puerto Rico
 List of airports in Puerto Rico

References

External links 

Air Charter Guide
Aviation-Safety Net

 
Airlines of Puerto Rico
Airlines established in 1965
Puerto Rican brands
1965 establishments in Puerto Rico